The Stanley Cup is a trophy awarded annually to the playoff champion club of the National Hockey League (NHL) ice hockey league. It was donated by the Governor General of Canada Lord Stanley of Preston in 1892, and is the oldest professional sports trophy in North America. Inscribed the Dominion Hockey Challenge Cup, the trophy was first awarded to Canada's amateur ice hockey clubs who won the trophy as the result of challenge games and league play. Professional clubs came to dominate the competition in the early years of the twentieth century, and in 1913 the two major professional ice hockey organizations, the National Hockey Association (NHA), forerunner of the NHL, and the Pacific Coast Hockey Association (PCHA), reached a gentlemen's agreement in which their respective champions would face each other in an annual series for the Stanley Cup. After a series of league mergers and folds, it became the de facto championship trophy of the NHL in 1926, though it was nominally still subject to external challenge. After 1947, the Cup became the de jure NHL championship prize.

From 1914 to the end of the 2022 season, the trophy has been won 106 times. 25 teams have won the cup, 20 of which are still active in the NHL. Prior to that, the challenge cup was held by nine teams. The Montreal Canadiens have won the Stanley Cup 24 times and made the Finals an additional eleven times. There were two years when the Stanley Cup was not awarded: 1919, because of the Spanish flu pandemic, and 2005, because of the NHL lockout.

Challenge Cup era (1893–1914)

The origins of the Challenge era come from the method of play of the Amateur Hockey Association of Canada prior to 1893. From 1887 to 1893, the league did not play a round-robin format, but rather challenges between teams of the association that year, with the winner of the series being the 'interim' champion, with the final challenge winner becoming the league champion for the year. The Stanley Cup kept the tradition going, but added league championships as another way that a team could win the trophy. If a team in the same league as the current champion won the league championship, it would then inherit the Cup, without a challenge. The only time this rule was not followed was in 1904, when the Ottawa Senators club withdrew from its league, the CAHL. The trustees ruled that the Cup stayed with Ottawa, instead of the CAHL league champion.

During the challenge cup period, none of the leagues that played for the trophy had a formal playoff system to decide their respective champions; whichever team finished in first place after the regular season won the league title. A playoff would only be played if teams tied for first-place in their leagues at the end of the regular season. Challenge games were played until 1912 at any time during hockey season by challenges approved and/or ordered by the Stanley Cup trustees. In 1912, Cup trustees declared that it was only to be defended at the end of the champion team's regular season.

In 1908, the Allan Cup was introduced as the trophy for Canada's amateurs, as the Stanley Cup became a symbol of professional hockey supremacy.

This table lists the outcome of all Stanley Cup wins, including successful victories and defenses in challenges, and league championships for the challenge era.

Notes
A. Although the Montreal Victorias won the AHAC title in 1895, the Stanley Cup trustees had already accepted a challenge from the 1894 Cup champion Montreal HC and Queen's University. As a compromise, the trustees decided that if the Montreal HC won the challenge match, the Victorias would become the Stanley Cup champions. The Montreals eventually won the game, 5–1, and their crosstown rivals were awarded the Cup.

B. Intended to be a best-of-three series, Ottawa Capitals withdrew their challenge after the first game.

C. The January 31 (a Saturday) game was tied 2–2 at midnight and the Mayor of Westmount refused to allow play to continue on Sunday. The game was played on February 2 (a Monday) and the January 31 game was considered to be void.

D. For most of 1904, the Ottawa Hockey Club was not affiliated with any league.

E. The Montreal Wanderers were disqualified as the result of a dispute. After game one ended tied at the end of regulation, 5–5, the Wanderers refused to play overtime with the current referee, and then subsequently refused to play the next game of the series in Ottawa.

F. During the series, it was revealed that the Victoria club had not filed a formal challenge. A letter arrived from the Stanley Cup trustees on March 17, stating that the trustees would not let the Stanley Cup travel west, as they did not consider Victoria a proper challenger because they had not formally notified the trustees. However, on March 18, Trustee William Foran stated that it was a misunderstanding. PCHA president Frank Patrick had not filed a challenge because he had expected Emmett Quinn, president of the NHA to make all of the arrangements in his role as hockey commissioner, whereas the trustees thought they were being deliberately ignored. In any case, all arrangements had been ironed out and the Victoria challenge was accepted.

Sources
 
 Montreal Gazette
 Ottawa Citizen
 Ottawa Journal
 Winnipeg Tribune

NHA/NHL vs. PCHA/WCHL/WHL champions (1915–1926)
Several days after the Victoria Aristocrats – Toronto Hockey Club series, Stanley Cup trustee William Foran wrote to NHA president Emmett Quinn that the trustees are "perfectly satisfied to allow the representatives of the three pro leagues (NHA, PCHA, and Maritime) to make all arrangements each season as to the series of matches to be played for the Cup." The Maritime league did not challenge for cup in 1914, and folded after the 1915 season. The Stanley Cup championship finals alternated between the East and the West each year, with games played alternately under NHA or PCHA rules. The Cup trustees agreed to this new arrangement, because after the Allan Cup became the highest prize for amateur hockey teams in Canada, the trustees had become dependent on the top two professional leagues to bolster the prominence of the trophy. After the New Westminster Royals moved to Portland in the summer of 1914 becoming the Portland Rosebuds, an American-based team, the trustees issued a statement that the Cup was no longer for the best team in Canada, but now for the best team in the world. In March 1916, the Rosebuds became the first American team to play in the Stanley Cup championship final. In 1917, the Seattle Metropolitans became the first American team to win the Cup. After that season, the NHA suspended operations and the National Hockey League (NHL) took its place.

In 1919, the Spanish influenza epidemic forced the Montreal Canadiens and the Seattle Metropolitans to cancel their series tied at 2–2–1, marking the first time the Stanley Cup was not awarded.

The format for the Stanley Cup championship changed in 1922, with the creation of the Western Canada Hockey League (WCHL). Now three leagues competed for the Cup and this necessitated a semi-final series between two league champions, with the third having a bye directly to the final. In 1924, the PCHA folded and only the Vancouver and Victoria teams entered the WCHL. With the loss of the PCHA, the championship reverted to a single series. After their win in 1925, the Victoria Cougars became the last team outside the NHL to win the Stanley Cup. For the 1925–26 season the WCHL was renamed the Western Hockey League (WHL). With the Victoria Cougars' loss in 1926, it would be the last time a non-NHL team competed for the Stanley Cup.

Numbers in parentheses in the table indicate the number of times that team has appeared in the Stanley Cup Finals, as well as each respective teams' Stanley Cup Finals record to date.

NHL champions (since 1927)
When the WHL folded in 1926 its remaining assets were acquired by the NHL, making it the only remaining league with teams competing for the Cup. Other leagues and clubs have issued challenges, but from that year forward no non-NHL team has played for it, leading it to become the de facto championship trophy of the NHL. In 1947, the NHL reached an agreement with trustees P. D. Ross and Cooper Smeaton to grant control of the Cup to the NHL, allowing the league itself to reject challenges from other leagues that may have wished to play for the Cup. A 2006 Ontario Superior Court case found that the trustees had gone against Lord Stanley's conditions in the 1947 agreement. The NHL has agreed to allow other teams to play for the Cup should the league not be operating, as was the case in the 2004–05 NHL lockout.

Since 1927, the league's playoff format, deciding which teams advanced to the Stanley Cup Finals, has changed multiple times. In some systems that were previously used, playoff teams were seeded regardless of division or conference. From 1942 to 1967 the Cup was competed for by the league's six teams, also known as the Original Six. After the 1967 NHL Expansion, the Stanley Cup was competed for by the winners of each conference. From 1982 to 2020, the Finals was played between the league's conference playoff champions; during that period the Campbell/Western champions went a combined 111–101 in the Finals against the Wales/Eastern champions (winning 20 of 38 series). In 2021, the COVID-19 pandemic and the resulting travel restrictions along the Canada–United States border forced the league to temporarily realign the teams into four regional divisions with no conferences, and hold a divisional-based playoff format: the four divisional playoff champions advanced to the Stanley Cup Semifinals, and the winners of those series moved on to the Finals. The league then returned to the Eastern vs. Western Conference format in 2022.

Numbers in parentheses in the table indicate the number of times that team has appeared in the Stanley Cup Finals, as well as each respective team's Stanley Cup Finals record to date.

Championships summary
 1927–1928: American Division vs. Canadian Division
 1929–1967, 1971–1981, 2021: Teams advanced to the Finals regardless of division or conference
 1968–1970: East Division vs. West Division
 1982–1993: Campbell Conference vs. Prince of Wales Conference
 1994–2020, 2022–: Eastern Conference vs. Western Conference

Appearances

Challenge Cup era (1893–1914)
Legend: SC = successful Stanley Cup challenge or defense of championship (win); UC = unsuccessful Stanley Cup challenge or defense of championship (loss); Years in bold denote a Stanley Cup win.

The following 16 teams unsuccessfully challenged for a Stanley Cup only once: Berlin Dutchmen (1910), Dawson City Nuggets (1905), Halifax Crescents (1900), Moncton Victorias (1912), Montreal Canadiens (1914), New Glasgow Cubs (1906), Ottawa Capitals (1897), Ottawa Victorias (1908), Port Arthur Bearcats (1911), Smiths Falls (1906), Sydney Millionaires (1913), Toronto Marlboros (1904), Toronto Professionals (1908), Toronto Wellingtons (1902), Victoria Aristocrats (1914), Winnipeg Rowing Club (1904).

Stanley Cup Finals era (since 1915)

Active teams
In the sortable table below, teams are ordered first by number of appearances, then by number of wins, and finally by alphabetical order. In the "Years of appearance" column, bold years indicate winning Stanley Cup Finals appearances. Unless marked otherwise, teams played in the NHL exclusively at the time they competed for the Stanley Cup.

Five active teams have yet to make a Stanley Cup Finals appearance. Three of these teams have remained in the same location since their inceptions:
 Columbus Blue Jackets (20 seasons, 6 playoffs)
 Minnesota Wild (20 seasons, 11 playoffs, 1 division title)
 Seattle Kraken (1 season)

The other two teams have relocated and have not made the Finals in either location:
 Atlanta Thrashers (11 seasons, 1 playoff, 1 division title) / Winnipeg Jets (10 seasons, 5 playoffs)
 Winnipeg Jets (original team) (17 seasons, 11 playoffs) / Phoenix/Arizona Coyotes (24 seasons, 9 playoffs, 1 division title)

Five relocated teams that have won the Stanley Cup in their current locations and never in their former locations:
 Quebec Nordiques (16 seasons, 9 playoffs, 2 division titles) – won 3 Stanley Cups as Colorado Avalanche
 Kansas City Scouts (2 seasons, never made playoff contention)/Colorado Rockies (6 seasons, 1 playoff) – won 3 Stanley Cups as New Jersey Devils
 California Golden Seals (9 seasons, 2 playoffs)/Cleveland Barons (2 seasons, never made playoff contention) – merged with Minnesota North Stars who lost twice in the Finals then won the Stanley Cup once as Dallas Stars
 Atlanta Flames (8 seasons, 6 playoffs) – won Stanley Cup once as Calgary Flames
 Hartford Whalers (18 seasons, 8 playoffs, 1 division title) – won Stanley Cup once as Carolina Hurricanes

Defunct teams
Listed after the team name is the name of the affiliated league(s) when the team competed for the Stanley Cup. A bold year denotes a Stanley Cup win.

Notes
 The Montreal Canadiens and the Seattle Metropolitans appearance totals include the 1919 Stanley Cup Finals that ended with a no-decision because of the Spanish flu epidemic. It is not considered an official series win or loss by either team.
 The franchise known today as the Toronto Maple Leafs won the Cup in 1918 as the Toronto Hockey Club (later engraved on the Stanley Cup as the Toronto Arenas in 1947), and in 1922 as the Toronto St. Patricks.
 The Chicago Blackhawks were known as the Chicago Black Hawks prior to the 1986–87 season.
 The Dallas Stars totals include two series losses as the Minnesota North Stars.
 The Anaheim Ducks totals include one series loss as the Mighty Ducks of Anaheim.
 The Ottawa Senators (1992–present) are named after the original Senators (1883–1934).

See also

References

General

Specific

External links
 List of winners of the Stanley Cup
 List of winning rosters of the Stanley Cup

 
Stanley Cup